Mark Ilgenfritz (born August 9, 1952) is a former American football defensive end. He played for the Cleveland Browns in 1974.

References

1952 births
Living people
American football defensive ends
Vanderbilt Commodores football players
Cleveland Browns players